Rajinder Kaur Bhattal (born 30 September 1945) is an Indian politician and member of Congress who served as the 14th Chief Minister of Punjab from 1996 to 1997 and 2nd Deputy Chief Minister of Punjab from 2004 to 2007. She is the first and so far only female to hold the office of Chief Minister in Punjab. Overall she is 8th female Chief Minister and 3rd female deputy chief minister in India. Since 1992 she has won from Lehra Assembly Constituency five terms consecutively.

Early life 
She was born on 30 September 1945 in Lahore in Punjab to Hira Singh Bhattal and Harnam Kaur. She was married to Lal Singh Sidhu at village Changali Wala, Lehragaga in Sangrur district and had two children, a girl and a boy.

Political career 
In 1994, Bhattal was a state education minister in Chandigarh.
Bhattal became the first female Chief Minister of Punjab when she took office after the resignation of Harcharan Singh Brar, serving from November 1996 to February 1997, the eighth female Chief Minister in Indian history. Her initiatives as Chief Minister of Punjab included, in December 1996, a scheme to provide grants of free electricity to small farmers in order to power wells.

After the Congress party lost the February 1997 assembly elections in Punjab, bringing an end to her term as Chief Minister, Bhattal took over as president of the Punjab Pradesh Congress Committee from Singh Randhawa in May, and then as leader of the Congress Legislature Party until October 1998, when she was ousted from her position and replaced by Chaudhary Jagjit Singh. Her ousting, amid claims of misleading statements about the involvement of the Congress leadership, was followed by a protracted dispute with Amarinder Singh, who had succeeded her as Punjab Congress president, and who was seen as responsible for her removal. By 2003, Bhattal had publicly pledged to remove Singh from his position as Chief Minister and was backed by dozens of dissident MLAs from the Congress party. The dispute saw intervention from the central command of the Congress party in New Delhi, with Sonia Gandhi taking a hand in negotiations. Initially the dissident group led by Bhattal rejected any solution other than the removal of Singh.

In January 2004, Bhattal accepted a position as deputy chief minister of Punjab, with other dissidents also taking roles in the cabinet, in a bid to heal the divisions. Denying that the dissidents had made demands in order to gain these concessions, Bhattal said that she had accepted the post because Sonia Gandhi had asked her to do so. In March 2007, Bhattal became leader of the Congress Legislature Party in Punjab Vidhan Sabha. The dispute rumbled on, however, and in April 2008 the party high command once again had to intervene, this time asking both Singh and Bhattal to cease speaking to the media about their disagreements.

During this period, Bhattal also saw off attempted prosecutions, with a court acquitting her of corruption charges in April 2008. Continuing as Punjab Congress leader, she also took credit for successfully pressuring the administration of Parkash Singh Badal to introduce a debt waiver scheme for farmers.

As of June 2011, Bhattal remains the Punjab Congress Legislature Party leader.

She was one of the 42 INC MLAs who submitted their resignation in protest of a decision of the Supreme Court of India ruling Punjab's termination of the Sutlej-Yamuna Link (SYL) water canal unconstitutional.

References 

Living people
Chief Ministers of Punjab, India
Indian National Congress politicians from Punjab, India
Punjab, India MLAs 1992–1997
1945 births
People from Lahore
Punjabi people
Women chief ministers of Indian states
Leaders of the Opposition in Punjab, India
Chief ministers from Indian National Congress
20th-century Indian women politicians
20th-century Indian politicians
Deputy chief ministers of Punjab, India
Women deputy chief ministers of Indian states
Women members of the Punjab Legislative Assembly